Andrew R. L. Cayton (May 9, 1954 – December 17, 2015) was a scholar of early American history. He taught at Harvard, Wellesley, Ball State, and, from 1990 to 2015, at Miami University (Ohio).  In 2015 he was appointed  Warner Woodring Chair in History at the Ohio State University. He has been the John Adams (Fulbright) Professor of American Studies at Leiden University in the Netherlands; a fellow of the Rockefeller Foundation Center at Bellagio, Italy; and a resident fellow at the Robert H. Smith International Center for Jefferson Studies in Monticello, Virginia; and was the 2012–2013 Frank H. Kenan Fellow at the National Humanities Center in Research Triangle Park, North Carolina.

He has received teaching awards from the Associated Student Government of Miami University, the College of Arts and Science of Miami University, and the Ohio Academy of History, and was a Distinguished Lecturer of the Organization of American Historians. Cayton was born in Cincinnati, Ohio, on May 9, 1954, son of Robert Frank (a librarian at Marietta College) and Vivian (a high school teacher) Cayton.  He was married to historian Mary Kupiec Cayton.  They have two daughters, Elizabeth and Hannah.  He died of cancer on December 17, 2015.

Cayton received his B.A. from the University of Virginia, and his M.A. and Ph.D. from Brown in 1981, working under the direction of Gordon Wood. Cayton  has been called the "premier modern historian of the American Midwest" and is also well known for his work on British North America. In addition he was interested in Atlantic world history.  In 2011–2012, he served as president for the Society of Historians of the Early American Republic (SHEAR) and in 2015 as president of the Ohio Academy of History. In 2013 he published Love at the Time of Revolution: Transatlantic Literary Radicalism and Historical Change, 1793-1818.  Cayton wrote with Fred Anderson The Dominion of War: Empire and Liberty in North America, 1500-2000 (2005).  He regularly reviewed books for The New York Times.

He edited, with Richard Sisson and Christian Zacher, The American Midwest: An Interpretive Encyclopedia; with Stuart Hobbs, The Center of a Great Empire”: The Ohio Country in the Early American Republic; with Susan E. Gray, The American Midwest: Essays on Regional History.

Publications 
 Love in the Time of Revolution, UNC Press, 2013.
 The Dominion of War: Empire and Liberty in North America, 1500-2000, with Fred Anderson, Viking, 2005.
(a History Book Club Selection, a Washington Post Best Book of 2005,
and a 2005 Book of the Year in the Times Literary Supplement);
 Ohio: The History of a People, The Ohio State University Press, 2002.
 Contact Points: American Frontiers from the Mohawk Valley to the Mississippi, edited with Fredrika J. Teute, UNC Press, 1998.
 Frontier Indiana: A History of the Trans-Appalachian Frontier, Indiana University Press, 1998
 The Midwest and the Nation: Rethinking the History of an American Region, with Peter S. Onuf, Indiana University Press, 1990.
 The Frontier Republic: Ideology and Politics in the Ohio Country, 1780-1825, Kent State University Press, 1986.

References

External links 
 
 http://www.legacy.com/obituaries/dispatch/obituary.aspx?n=andrew-robert-lee-cayton&pid=176968869&
 New York Times Articles
 http://earlyamericanists.com/2015/12/22/in-memoriam-andrew-cayton/ 

1954 births
2015 deaths
Miami University faculty
21st-century American historians
21st-century American male writers
Historians of the United States
University of Virginia alumni
Brown University alumni
American male non-fiction writers